Mohammad Nurikhwan bin Othman (born 15 January 1993) is a Bruneian footballer who currently plays as a defender  or midfielder for DPMM FC.

Club career
Nurikhwan attended Brunei's Sports School as a youngster and progressed enough to be a regular in the national youth team side that played in the Brunei Premier League II in 2010 and 2011. After the creation of the Brunei National Football League (precursor to the Brunei Super League) by the newly formed NFABD, the young prodigy chose Indera SC as his club, becoming league champions in 2012-13 and 2014.

Nurikhwan signed for professional side DPMM FC of the S.League in 2016 and made his debut in a 3–2 loss to Albirex Niigata (S) on 13 February.

Nurikhwan was converted into a defender by new head coach Adrian Pennock in the 2019 season, mirroring his teammate Yura Indera Putera in doing so. On 6 July of that season, in the away game against Warriors FC, he was shown a straight red for felling Sahil Suhaimi in the penalty box and was adjudged by the referee to have denied the Singaporean a goal-scoring opportunity. This turned the tide to the home side's advantage and the game finished in a 3–3 draw.

Nurikhwan became a Singapore Premier League champion in September 2019 in his first season operating as a centre-back, his club also registering the joint-best defense in the league.

Nurikhwan scored his first DPMM FC goal in the first DPMM FC fixture of the 2021 Brunei Super League against BAKES FC on 28 June 2021. With his team playing domestically for the third year in a row in 2022, he performed solidly against local opposition at the 2022 Brunei FA Cup, managing to be awarded the Player of the Tournament after the final where his team won 2–1 against Kasuka FC on 4 December.

International career
Nurikhwan played with the Brunei Under-21s in the 2012 Hassanal Bolkiah Trophy when the home side emerged as victors. He played every game and scored in the semi-final against Myanmar. He was made captain for the 2014 edition although his side failed to defend the title.

Nurikhwan's full international career began when he played the first half in a friendly against Indonesia on 26 September 2012. He played for the Wasps in the 2012, 2014 and 2018 AFF Suzuki Cup qualifying rounds. He was also poised to join the national team for the 2022 World Cup first-round qualifying but declared himself unavailable.

Nurikhwan returned to the national team in September 2022 for the friendly matches against the Maldives and Laos. He started the match against the island nation on 21 September which ended in a 0–3 loss. Later that November, he played at centre-back for both legs of the 2022 AFF Mitsubishi Electric Cup qualifying against Timor-Leste held in Brunei. The Wasps qualified for the Cup by winning 6–3 on aggregate. The following month, he made three starts against Thailand, the Philippines and Cambodia and managed to score against Cambodia in a 5–1 defeat.

International goals

Honours

Team
Indera SC
Brunei Super League (2): 2012–13, 2014
DPMM FC
 Singapore Premier League: 2019
 Brunei FA Cup: 2022

International
Brunei national under-21 football team
Hassanal Bolkiah Trophy: 2012

Individual
 
  Meritorius Service Medal (PJK) (2012)
 2022 Brunei FA Cup Player of the Tournament

References

External links

1993 births
Living people
Association football midfielders
Bruneian footballers
Brunei international footballers
DPMM FC players
Indera SC players
Competitors at the 2013 Southeast Asian Games
Southeast Asian Games competitors for Brunei